The 2021 Orlando Pride season was Orlando Pride's sixth season in the National Women's Soccer League, the top division of women's soccer in the United States.

Notable events
On November 12, 2020, with the addition of Racing Louisville FC ahead of the 2021 NWSL season, the NWSL held the 2020 NWSL Expansion Draft. Alanna Kennedy, who had been with the Pride since 2017, was selected as were the NWSL rights to Caitlin Foord which Orlando had acquired from Portland Thorns FC as part of the trade for Emily Sonnett in January 2020 but she had elected to sign outside the NWSL with English FA WSL team Arsenal instead.

On January 12, Orlando announced Ian Fleming had joined from the Houston Dynamo and Dash group to become general manager of the Pride, filling the vacant role left by Erik Ustruck in January 2020.

On February 25, the NWSL announced the list of federated players for the upcoming season. It included four Pride players: US internationals Ashlyn Harris, Ali Krieger and Alex Morgan all retained their status while Canadian goalkeeper Erin McLeod was given federated status for the first time since 2015 meaning she would no longer require an international roster slot.

On April 5, U.S. Soccer and NWSL announced it would be trialing the new IFAB approved concussion substitutes rule allowing for two additional substitutions  in each match to be used for players with suspected concussions. The new rule was implemented on top of the increase from three to five "normal" substitutes carried over from the 2020 season.

On April 21, Orlando Pride beat Washington Spirit 1–0 in the Challenge Cup, their first win since August 21, 2019, snapping a streak of 13 winless games in 609 days. The match also marked the first time Marta, Sydney Leroux and Alex Morgan all started a game for Orlando together since July 2018.

Four Orlando Pride players were selected to represent their nations at the delayed 2020 Tokyo Olympics in July: Marta, Erin McLeod, Alex Morgan and Ali Riley.

On July 21, the sale of Orlando City SC and related soccer assets including Orlando Pride by Flavio Augusto da Silva, who took over in 2013, was completed. Zygi, Leonard and Mark Wilf became the new majority owners with the DeVos family, led by Dan DeVos, entering as minority owners. The combined value of the deal was estimated at $400–450 million.

On July 23, Marc Skinner stepped down as head coach amid reports he had agreed terms with Manchester United. His assistant, Carl Green, took temporary control for the team's match against OL Reign the following day before also departing. Becky Burleigh, who had retired after 26 seasons as head coach of the Florida Gators in April, was appointed interim head coach for the remainder of the 2021 season on July 25.

On July 28, it was announced Alex Leitão, the chief executive officer of the Orlando City SC organization since 2015, was stepping down from his role.

On October 1, the NWSL announced all scheduled games would not take place that weekend following allegations of historic abuse and sexual coercion against former North Carolina Courage coach Paul Riley. Riley was the fourth head coach to be sacked having been accused of misconduct during the 2021 season after Farid Benstiti, Richie Burke and Christy Holly.

Roster

Staff 
.

Match results

Friendlies
As per the league schedule, NWSL teams were permitted to begin preseason activities on February 1, 2021. Orlando Pride scheduled five preseason friendlies.

National Women's Soccer League

The NWSL regular season will begin on May 15 and conclude on October 30. Six teams will qualify for the playoffs.

Results summary

Results by round

Results

League standings

NWSL Challenge Cup 

Following the success of the 2020 NWSL Challenge Cup as a replacement tournament, the NWSL announced the return of the competition as part of the regular schedule in 2021. The competition is scheduled to begin on April 9, prior to the start of the NWSL regular season. With the league split regionally into two groups of five, teams were scheduled to play each divisional opponent once with the top team progressing to the final. Orlando Pride were placed in the East division with North Carolina Courage, NJ/NY Gotham FC, Washington Spirit, and new expansion franchise Racing Louisville.

Group stage

Squad statistics

Appearances 

Starting appearances are listed first, followed by substitute appearances after the + symbol where applicable.

|-
! colspan=12 style=background:#dcdcdc; text-align:center|Goalkeepers

|-
! colspan=12 style=background:#dcdcdc; text-align:center|Defenders

|-
! colspan=12 style=background:#dcdcdc; text-align:center|Midfielders

|-
! colspan=12 style=background:#dcdcdc; text-align:center|Forwards

|-
|colspan="12"|Players away from the club on loan:

|}

Goalscorers

Shutouts

Disciplinary record

Transfers and loans

2021 NWSL Draft 

Draft picks are not automatically signed to the team roster. The 2021 college draft was held on January 13, 2021. Orlando had four selections. All four draftees elected to take up the NCAA waiver in light of the COVID-19 pandemic that meant they were able to remain in college to contest the rescheduled college spring season. The Pride retained the NWSL rights to all four. At the end of the college season, Kaylie Collins signed a National Team Replacement contract on June 4, and Viviana Villacorta was signed to a one-year plus option year contract and immediately placed on the season-ending disabled list on August 6. Mikayla Colohan and Kerry Abello both announced they would return to their respective colleges for the 2021 season and exhaust their final year of eligibility.

Transfers in

Transfers out

Loans out

Preseason trialists 
Orlando Pride began preseason training on February 1, 2021. The squad included two non-roster invitees on trial with the team during preseason. Haran had been with Orlando during the 2020 Fall Series and made two appearances. Tymrak was not yet contracted and rostered having come out of retirement when Orlando acquired her playing rights in a trade in January. They were later joined by Gabby English who had most recently been in Portugal with Boavista and Jamaican international Lauren Silver who had spent the 2020 Fall Series signed to Houston Dash.

References

External links 

 

2021 National Women's Soccer League season
2021
American soccer clubs 2021 season
2021 in sports in Florida